Wattkopf is a mountain of Baden-Württemberg, Germany.

Mountains and hills of Baden-Württemberg
Mountains and hills of the Black Forest